Santino (20 April 1978  –  14 December 2022) was a male chimpanzee held at Furuvik Zoo in Sweden. In March 2009, it was reported that Santino had planned hundreds of stone-throwing attacks on visitors to the zoo. Santino was shot after escaping his enclosure in December 2022, and later died from his injuries.

Biography
Zookeepers noticed, after observing Santino behind blind glass, that the chimpanzee had been busy stockpiling ammunition in anticipation of the visitors, dragging stones from a protective moat and even thumping chunks of concrete into rough discs. He made the piles of stones only on the part of his island facing the crowds. Dr. Mathias Osvath, a cognitive zoologist from Lund University, together with Elin Karvonen, studied the phenomenon, and their studies suggest that Santino's behaviour shows that  planning and premeditated deception are not uniquely human traits.

To control his behaviour, and keep his hormone levels down, zookeepers castrated Santino. Afterwards, Santino had been observed to be more playful and was described as growing a "Buddha belly".

Media coverage
On 19 March 2009, Santino and his attacks were mentioned as a part of "when animals attack our morals" on The Colbert Report, which brought to light the poor understanding that exists between man and ape. Also discussed was how these incidents are not limited to "animals" alone, but humans in general.

In Australia's Fairfax newspapers on 20 December 2009, staff writer Andrew Tate made a humorous case that Santino's behaviour elevated him to the status of environmental activist of the year, given the lack of global political action on climate change and environmental degradation. Despite Santino's castration, the article argued that politicians and voters needed to emulate Santino's disgruntled example en masse to ensure better outcomes and improve the environment.

See also
 List of individual apes

References 

May 2009 Scientific American

1978 animal births
2022 animal deaths
Individual chimpanzees
Primate attacks
Individual animals in Sweden
Art by primates
Swedish painters